Randal Bays (born 1950) is an American fiddler, guitarist and composer.  This Irish-style fiddle and guitar player first gained international recognition through his recordings and performances with Co. Clare fiddler Martin Hayes in the early 1990s.

Early life and education
Born in Indiana in 1950, Bays relocated to the Pacific Northwest as a teenager and has made his home in Oregon and Washington since then. He began playing music at the age of eigh, and his musical life included serious study of the classical guitar, prior to taking up Irish fiddling in the 1970s. At the time, he lived in Portland, Oregon, and was strongly influenced by Co. Cavan accordion player Michael Beglan, also fiddler Kevin Burke and guitarist Mícheál Ó Domhnaill.

Career
Since then Bays has recorded and performed with many of the leading Irish traditional musicians, including James Kelly, Martin Hayes, Gearóid Ó hAllmhuráin, John Williams, Aine Meenaghan, Dáithí Sproule and James Keane.  He now tours mostly as a solo performer and with various duet partners.  In 2002 Bays co-founded the Friday Harbor Irish Music Camp in Washington's San Juan Islands, and served as Artistic Director until the camp's demise in 2011.  He is now Program Director of the Cascadia Irish Music Week a yearly music week in Washington state.

In 1995 Bays began releasing his own albums under the Foxglove Records label, which he founded, including Out of the Woods, The Salmon's Leap, House to House with Roger Landes — voted best traditional album of 2005 by the Irish Times - Overland with Dáithí Sproule, and several more.  In 2011 he released his first solo fingerstyle guitar CD, Oyster Light, which has been highly praised by such guitar luminaries as Tony McManus and Daithi Sproule.

Critical reception
Don Meade wrote in The Irish Voice (New York, Jan. 2001) that Bays is "still best known to many for his beautiful guitar accompaniment on fiddler Martin Hayes' early recordings, [but] Randal is himself a marvelous fiddler, one of the best in the country."

The Irish Examiner deemed Bays "a rare beast, a master of both the fiddle and the guitar," and Fiddler Magazine said he is "among the best Irish style fiddlers of his generation."

Discography

Albums
 The Quiet Pint - 2014 (Foxglove Records)
 A Rake Of Tunes - 2014 (Foxglove Records)
 Oyster Light - 2011 (Foxglove Records) [guitar album]
 Dig With It - 2009 with Dave Marshall (Foxglove Records)
 Fingal - 2008 with Dáithí Sproule and James Keane (New Folk Records)
 Katy Bar The Door - 2006 (Foxglove Records)
 House To House - 2004 with Roger Landes (Foxglove Records)
 Overland - 2004 with Dáithí Sproule (Foxglove Records)
 The Salmon's Leap - 2000 (Foxglove Records)
 Out Of The Woods - 1997 (Foxglove Records)
 Pigtown Fling - 1996 with Joel Bernstein (Foxglove Records)
 The Rashers - 1988 with Joel Bernstein
 Celtic Music Of The Northwest - 1982 with Wildgeese

Guest appearances
 Lost River, Volume 1 - 2011 Dáithí Sproule (New Folk Records)
 Masters Of The Irish Guitar - 2006 various artists (Shanachie Records)
 Steam - 2001 John Williams (Green Linnet Records)
 World Festival of Sacred Music: Europe - 1999 various artists (CCnC Records) 
 Wayfarer - 1999 John Doan (Hearts Of Space Records)
 Eire: Isle of the Saints (A Celtic Odyssey) - 1997 John Doan (Hearts Of Space Records)
 Wind On The Water - 1995 Nancy Curtin (Foxglove Records)
 John Williams - 1995 John Williams (Green Linnet Records)
 Under The Moon - 1995 Martin Hayes (Green Linnet Records)
 Songs From Vanyel's Time - 1994 Shadow Stalker (Firebird Records)
 Martin Hayes - 1993 Martin Hayes (Green Linnet Records)
 The Traveler's Return - 1990 Nancy Curtin
 Above The Tower - 1985 Magical Strings (Flying Fish)
 Nancy Curtin - 1985 Nancy Curtin

References

The Irish Times, Dublin 2005 - Review of "House to House" **** (Four stars)
Dirty Linen Magazine (US) April, 2001 - Review of "The Salmon's Leap"
Tradition Magazine (UK) - (by Judith Gennett)
Fiddler Magazine (Nova Scotia, Canada) - Review of "The Salmon's Leap" 
The Irish Voice (New York), Jan. 2001, - Review of "The Salmon's Leap"
Folkworks Magazine (US)Rating: ***** - Dennis Stone, "Folkworks" Jan. 2001 - Review of "The Salmon's Leap"
Tradition Magazine (UK) - (by Judith Gennett)
Dirty Linen Magazine, March 1997 "The Pigtown Fling" 1996  "Ebullient, buoyant Irish music...must be heard to be believed." 
Irish America Magazine, February 1997 "The Pigtown Fling" 1996 "One of the Top Ten Celtic CDs of the year." 
Dirty Linen Magazine, "Out of the Woods" 1997 "Dazzling...a must for any fan of fiddle or guitar."

External links

1950 births
Living people
20th-century American guitarists
20th-century American violinists
21st-century American guitarists
21st-century American violinists
American fiddlers
Guitarists from Indiana
Irish fiddlers